Hair is an album by bandleader Stan Kenton featuring big band versions of tunes from the rock musical Hair recorded in 1969 for Capitol Records.

Track listing
All compositions by Galt MacDermot, James Rado and Gerome Ragni.
 "Aquarius" - 3:00
 "Walking in Space" - 3:57
 "Frank Mills" - 2:10
 "I Got Life" - 2:15
 "Colored Spade" - 4:07
 "Where Do I Go?" - 2:48
 "Sodomy" - 4:41
 "Hare Krishna (Be In)" - 3:05
 "Easy to Be Hard" - 3:10
 "Good Morning Starshine" - 2:45

Personnel

Stan Kenton - piano, conductor
John Audino, Bud Brisbois, Ollie Mitchell, Ray Triscari - trumpet, flugelhorn
Rob Hicks, Jim Kartchner - trumpet 
Jack Sheldon - flugelhorn
Gil Falco, Dick Nash, Dick Shearer, Tommy Shepard  - trombone
Graham Ellis, Morris Repass, George Roberts - bass trombone
Sam Most, Bud Shank - alto saxophone, flute, piccolo
Bob Cooper - tenor saxophone, flute
Jim Horn - tenor saxophone, flute, piccolo
Gene Cipriano - tenor saxophone, flute, piccolo, oboe
Jack Nimitz - baritone saxophone, bass saxophone, tenor saxophone, flute, clarinet
Bob Hood - tenor saxophone, flute, baritone saxophone, clarinet, piccolo
Clark Gassman - piano, harpsichord, ondioline
Ralph Grierson - harpsichord, ondioline
Dennis Budimir - guitar
Mike Deasy - guitar, banjo, mandolin, sitar
Chuck Domanico - bass, electric bass
Paul Humphrey - drums
Emil Richards - vibraphone, Latin percussion
Dale Anderson, Victor Feldman, Adolpho "Chino" Valdez - Latin percussion
Jacqueline Allan, Billie Barnum, Dick Castle, Wayne Dunstan, Loren Farber, Ronald Hicklin, Jimmy Joyce, Diana Lee, Jay Meyer, Julia Tillman, Carolyn Willis, Edna Wright - chorus
Ralph Carmichael - arranger

References

Stan Kenton albums
1969 albums
albums arranged by Ralph Carmichael
Capitol Records albums

Albums recorded at Capitol Studios
Albums produced by Lee Gillette